The High Commission of Denmark in Greenland is a Danish institution in Greenland.

Functions
The High Commissioner represents the crown and the Kingdom Government (Regeringen) in Greenland. The office is responsible for liaising between the Territorial Self Rule Government (Naalakkersuisut) and the Kingdom Government.

The High Commission deals with matters of family law in the capacity as Chief Administrative Officer.

The Government of Greenland notifies the High Commission of all statutes and regulations adopted by the Parliament of Greenland (Inatsisartut) and of any other general legislation drawn up by the Government of Greenland. In addition, the Government of Greenland may call on the High Commissioner to participate in negotiations within Greenlandic institutions.

The High Commissions tasks furthermore consist of:
Submitting periodic reports to the Kingdom's Ministry of State (Statsministeriet), attending meetings of the Parliament of Greenland, and submitting reports to the Prime Minister's Office and other relevant ministries about parliament's discussions.
Addressing as the magistrates, like the Agency of Family Law in the Denmark (proper), for family law matters in the kingdom. 
Participate in the planning and settlement of visits to Greenland from the royal family, the Kingdom Parliament (Folketinget), the government, others and participation in the related meeting activities.
Co-ordination of the more principled inquiries made by the State to the Self Rule Government.
Completion of transit permits for Thule Air Base to Danish nationals residing in Greenland.
Holding elections in Greenland to the Kingdom Parliament and any referendums decided by the Kingdom Government.
Decisions on complaints about public registration.
Setting the royal honors (knightly orders, medals and honors).

High Commissioner
The High Commissioner  may participate in all negotiations about matters of common interest in the Inatsisartut (the Parliament of Greenland), but has no vote.

The High Commissioner is an ex-officio member of The Greenlandic Fund.

List of High Commissioners

See also
 High Commission of Denmark, Tórshavn

References

External links
Official website

1979 establishments in Greenland
1979 establishments in Denmark
Denmark
Politics of Denmark